The  was a DC electric multiple unit (EMU) commuter train type operated by the private railway operator Tobu Railway in Japan.

A total of 164 7800 series vehicles were built between 1953 and 1961. With the exception of two vehicles withdrawn due to accident damage, all of the cars were ultimately rebuilt between 1978 and 1986 to become 5000 series sets.

Withdrawals
Two cars, 7808 and 808, were withdrawn in December 1970 following accident damage. The remaining 162 cars were rebuilt between 1978 and 1986 with new steel bodies as 5000 series sets.

References

Electric multiple units of Japan
7800 series
Train-related introductions in 1953